Adam Douglas Driver (born November 19, 1983) is an American actor. Recognized for his collaborations with auteur filmmakers, he is the recipient of various accolades, including nominations for two Academy Awards, four Primetime Emmy Awards and a Tony Award.

Driver made his Broadway debut in Mrs. Warren's Profession (2010) and subsequently appeared in Man and Boy (2011). He rose to prominence with a supporting role in the HBO comedy-drama series Girls (2012–2017), for which he received three consecutive Primetime Emmy nominations. Driver began his film career in supporting roles in Steven Spielberg's Lincoln (2012), Noah Baumbach's Frances Ha (2012), and the Coen brothers' Inside Llewyn Davis (2013). He won the Volpi Cup for Best Actor for his lead role in the drama Hungry Hearts (2014).

Driver gained wider recognition for playing Kylo Ren in the Star Wars sequel trilogy (2015–2019). He starred as a poet in Jim Jarmusch's Paterson (2016), and had supporting roles in Martin Scorsese's religious epic Silence (2016) and Steven Soderbergh's heist comedy Logan Lucky (2017). In 2019, he returned to the stage in the Broadway revival of Burn This, for which he was nominated for the Tony Award for Best Actor in a Play. He garnered consecutive Academy Award nominations: Best Supporting Actor for Spike Lee's BlacKkKlansman (2018) and Best Actor for Noah Baumbach's Marriage Story (2019). He has since starred in Ridley Scott's period films The Last Duel and House of Gucci (both 2021), and Baumbach's satire White Noise (2022).

Driver is a veteran of the U.S. Marine Corps. He is also the founder of Arts in the Armed Forces, a non-profit that provides free arts programming to American active-duty service members, veterans, military support staff, and their families worldwide.

Early life

Driver was born on November 19, 1983, in San Diego, California, the son of Nancy Wright (née Needham), a paralegal, and Joe Douglas Driver. He has Dutch, English, German, Irish and Scottish ancestry. His father's family is from Arkansas and his mother's family is from Indiana. His stepfather, Rodney G. Wright, is a minister at a Baptist church. When Driver was seven years old, he moved with his older sister and mother to his mother's hometown Mishawaka, Indiana, where he graduated from Mishawaka High School in 2001. Driver was raised Baptist, and sang in the choir at church.

Driver has described his teenage self as a "misfit"; he told M Magazine that he climbed radio towers, set objects on fire, and co-founded a fight club with friends, inspired by the 1999 film Fight Club. After high school, he worked as a door-to-door salesman selling Kirby vacuum cleaners and as a telemarketer for a basement waterproofing company and Ben Franklin Construction. He applied to the Juilliard School for drama but was not accepted.

Shortly after the September 11 attacks, Driver enlisted in the United States Marine Corps. He was assigned to Weapons Company, 1st Battalion, 1st Marines as an 81mm mortar man. He served for two years and eight months before fracturing his sternum while mountain biking. He was medically discharged with the rank of Lance Corporal.

Subsequently, Driver attended the University of Indianapolis for a year before auditioning again for Juilliard, this time succeeding. He got the news he was accepted while at work at the Target Distribution Center in Indianapolis. Driver has said that his classmates saw him as an intimidating and volatile figure, and he struggled to fit into a lifestyle so different from the Marines. He was a member of the Drama Division's Group 38 from 2005 to 2009, where he met his future wife, Joanne Tucker. He graduated with a Bachelor of Fine Arts in 2009.

Career

2009–2014: Early work and Girls 

After graduating from Juilliard, Driver moved to New York City, appearing in both Broadway and off-Broadway productions. Like many aspiring actors, he occasionally worked as a busboy and waiter. Driver appeared in several television shows and short films. He played a repentant witness and reluctant accomplice to an unsolved assault in the final episode of the television series The Unusuals. He made his film debut in Clint Eastwood's biographical drama film J. Edgar.

In 2012, Driver was cast in the HBO comedy-drama series Girls, as the emotionally unstable boyfriend of a writer (Lena Dunham). He received three nominations for the Primetime Emmy Award for Outstanding Supporting Actor in a Comedy Series for his role. The same year, Driver played supporting roles in two critically acclaimed films, as telegraph and cipher officer Samuel Beckwith in Steven Spielberg's historical drama Lincoln, and Lev Shapiro in Noah Baumbach's comedy-drama Frances Ha. He starred in the drama Not Waving But Drowning and the romantic-comedy Gayby. He garnered major off-Broadway recognition for playing Cliff, a working-class Welsh houseguest in Look Back in Anger, winning the Lucille Lortel Award for Outstanding Featured Actor in a Play.

In 2013, Driver appeared in the drama Bluebird and the romantic-comedy What If. He played a musician in the Coen Brothers' black comedy Inside Llewyn Davis, and photographer Rick Smolan in the drama Tracks. In 2014, he played Jude, a despairing father, in the drama Hungry Hearts; Jamie, an aspiring filmmaker, in Noah Baumbach's comedy While We're Young; and Phillip, the black sheep of a dysfunctional Jewish family, in the comedy-drama This Is Where I Leave You. For his performance in Hungry Hearts, Driver won the Volpi Cup for Best Actor at the 71st Venice International Film Festival. For Vogues September 2013 issue, Driver appeared in an editorial alongside Canadian model Daria Werbowy set in Ireland, photographed by Annie Leibovitz.

2015–present: Worldwide recognition

In early 2014, Driver was cast as villain Kylo Ren in Star Wars: The Force Awakens (2015). It was released on December 18, 2015, to commercial and critical success. He reprised the role in The Last Jedi (2017) and The Rise of Skywalker (2019). His performance was positively received, with his character lauded as the best in the series: David Edelstein of Vulture wrote, "the core of The Last Jedi — of this whole trilogy, it seems — is Driver's Kylo Ren, who ranks with cinema's most fascinating human monsters." Peter Bradshaw of The Guardian highlighted Driver's performance in his review of The Force Awakens, calling him "gorgeously cruel, spiteful and capricious... very suited to Kylo Ren's fastidious and amused contempt for his enemies' weakness and compassion."

In 2016, Driver played a supporting role in Jeff Nichols' sci-fi thriller Midnight Special, which was released on March 18, 2016. He also co-starred in Martin Scorsese's historical drama Silence (2016) as Father Francisco Garupe, a 17th-century Portuguese Jesuit priest, alongside Andrew Garfield and Liam Neeson. While filming, Driver lost almost 50 pounds. In Jim Jarmusch's drama film Paterson, Driver played the eponymous bus driver and poetry writer. The film premiered at the 69th Cannes Film Festival and was released on December 28, 2016. Driver's performance was acclaimed and he received multiple nominations for Best Actor from critics' associations, winning several, including the Los Angeles Film Critics Association Award for Best Actor. Peter Travers of Rolling Stone wrote "Driver's indelibly moving portrayal is so lived-in and lyrical you hardly recognize it as acting." Paterson was included in many critics' top ten lists of best films of 2016.

In 2017, Driver made a cameo in Noah Baumbach's The Meyerowitz Stories playing Randy and making his third appearance in one of their films. It premiered at the 70th Cannes Film Festival and was released on October 13, 2017, on Netflix. He played Clyde, a one-armed Iraq War veteran, in Steven Soderbergh's Logan Lucky, which was released on August 18, 2017. In 2018, Driver portrayed a Jewish police detective, Phillip "Flip" Zimmerman, who helps infiltrate the Ku Klux Klan in Spike Lee's comedy-drama BlacKkKlansman. The film premiered at 71st Cannes Film Festival and was theatrically released on August 10. He received critical acclaim for his performance in the film and was nominated for the Academy Award for Best Actor in a Supporting Role and the Golden Globe Award for Best Supporting Actor. Driver played Toby Grummett in Terry Gilliam's adventure-comedy film The Man Who Killed Don Quixote, which also premiered at Cannes.

In early 2019, Driver played Daniel J. Jones in Scott Z. Burns' political drama The Report, which premiered at the Sundance Film Festival in Utah. He returned to Broadway to play Pale against Keri Russell in a Michael Mayer-directed production of Lanford Wilson's Burn This, receiving acclaim for his explosive performance and a nomination for the Tony Award for Best Actor in a Play. He was part of the ensemble cast of Jim Jarmusch's zombie comedy film The Dead Don't Die, which premiered at the 72nd Cannes Film Festival and was released on June 14, 2019. That same year, Driver starred opposite Scarlett Johansson in Noah Baumbach's Marriage Story, which premiered at the 76th Venice International Film Festival. Reviewing the film in The Hollywood Reporter, critic Jon Frosch noted that Driver "delivers a brilliantly inhabited and shaded portrait" of a man undergoing a divorce. For his performance, he received a nomination for the Academy Award for Best Actor.

In 2020, Driver became the subject of a running gag on Last Week Tonight with John Oliver, in which Oliver expressed several strange masochistic fantasies about Driver, referencing his muscular build and masculine appearance. Driver eventually appeared on the final episode of the season and "demanded an apology". In 2021, he went viral for his shirtless appearance in the advertising campaign for Burberry's masculine fragrance Hero. Driver again returned for the advertising campaign for the eau de parfum concentration of Hero in 2022.

In 2021, Driver starred in Leos Carax's long-awaited musical drama film Annette, which premiered at the 74th Cannes Film Festival. He also played a leading role in Ridley Scott's historical drama The Last Duel, along with the biopic crime film House of Gucci, which covers the assassination of Maurizio Gucci, and was also directed by Scott. Equally praised by critics and directors, Driver's acting has a unique signature style that displays skittish, unpredictable physicality with full-bodied enthusiasm like Denis Lavant and Buster Keaton.

In 2022, Driver starred in the apocalyptic black comedy film White Noise, which marks his fifth collaboration with Baumbach.

Driver starred in the science fiction film 65, directed by Scott Beck and Bryan Woods. He stars in Jeff Nichols' historical film Yankee Commandante. Driver played Enzo Ferrari in Michael Mann's biopic film Ferrari. In May 2022, he was cast in Francis Ford Coppola's film Megalopolis.

Personal life
Driver married his longtime partner Joanne Tucker in June 2013. Tucker is the granddaughter of Bermudian politician Henry Tucker. The couple have a son, whose birth they kept private from the press for two years. As of February 2023, Tucker is pregnant with the couple’s second child.  They live in Brooklyn Heights with their son and dog. Driver is the founder of Arts in the Armed Forces (AITAF), a non-profit that performs theatre for all branches of the military in the United States and abroad.

Driver has said on multiple occasions that he does not like to watch or listen to his own performances. During a radio interview with NPR's Fresh Air, he chose not to continue with the interview after the host played a clip from Marriage Story. The executive producer of the radio show later claimed that Driver was warned to take off his headphones before the clip played, and that the show did something similar with Driver during a 2015 interview. During the same interview, Driver stated he disliked watching or listening to his acting work. He says his usual technique is to leave the theatre and, "then I go back, and when the lights come up, I stand up I pretend that I was there the whole time."

Filmography

Film

Television

Theatre

Video games

Theme park attractions

Awards and nominations

For his work on television, Driver has received four Primetime Emmy Award nominations. He received three nominations for his performance in Girls from 2013, 2014, and 2015, in the Outstanding Supporting Actor in a Comedy Series category. In 2020, he also received a nomination for Outstanding Guest Actor in a Comedy Series for his guest hosting role on Saturday Night Live. For his work in film, he has been nominated twice for an Academy Award, for his performances in Spike Lee's BlacKkKlansman (2018), and Noah Baumbach's Marriage Story (2019). He also received British Academy Film Award, Golden Globe Award, and Screen Actors Guild Award (SAG) nominations for those films as well. He also received a SAG Award nomination for Outstanding Performance by a Cast in a Motion Picture as a part of the ensemble of Steven Spielberg's Lincoln. In 2019 he received a Tony Award nomination for Best Actor in a Play for his performance in Burn This at the 73rd Tony Awards.

References

External links

 
 
 
 
 
 
 Adam Driver: Theatre Credits on Broadwayworld.com

Living people
1983 births
21st-century American male actors
American male film actors
American male stage actors
American male television actors
American male voice actors
American people of Dutch descent
American people of English descent
American people of German descent
American people of Irish descent
American people of Scottish descent
Best Actor AACTA International Award winners
Juilliard School alumni
Male actors from California
Male actors from Indiana
People from Brooklyn Heights
People from Mishawaka, Indiana
People from San Diego
United States Marines
University of Indianapolis alumni
Volpi Cup for Best Actor winners